Genlisea lobata is a corkscrew plant native to Brazil.

References 

lobata
Plants described in 1989
Carnivorous plants of South America
Flora of Brazil